In Greek mythology, Phorbas (Ancient Greek: Φόρβας, gen. Φόρβαντος) or Phorbaceus was a Thessalian prince and hero of the island of Rhodes. He was sometimes confounded with the Phlegyan Phorbas.

Family 
Phorbas was the son of Triopas and Hiscilla, daughter of Myrmidon, and thus brother to Erysichthon and Iphimedia, mother of the Aloads. He was probably the Phorbas who was identified as the father of Pelles, founder of Achaean Pellene, who fathered Hyperasius, father of the Argonauts Amphion and Asterius.

Mythology 
When the people of the island of Rhodes fell victim to a plague of masses of serpents (may have been dragons or simply snakes), an oracle directed them to call on a man named Phorbas. Phorbas cleansed the island of the snakes and in gratitude the Rhodians venerated him as a hero. For his achievement he won a place among the stars as the constellation Serpentarius or Ophiuchus. 

According to an early account, before his departure, Phorbas was a rival in love of the god Apollo. In a later account he was portrayed as Apollo's lover, consequently dying.

Notes 

Male lovers of Apollo
Princes in Greek mythology
Thessalian characters in Greek mythology

References 

 Apollonius Rhodius, Argonautica translated by Robert Cooper Seaton (1853-1915), R. C. Loeb Classical Library Volume 001. London, William Heinemann Ltd, 1912. Online version at the Topos Text Project.
Apollonius Rhodius, Argonautica. George W. Mooney. London. Longmans, Green. 1912. Greek text available at the Perseus Digital Library.
Diodorus Siculus, The Library of History translated by Charles Henry Oldfather. Twelve volumes. Loeb Classical Library. Cambridge, Massachusetts: Harvard University Press; London: William Heinemann, Ltd. 1989. Vol. 3. Books 4.59–8. Online version at Bill Thayer's Web Site
 Diodorus Siculus, Bibliotheca Historica. Vol 1-2. Immanel Bekker. Ludwig Dindorf. Friedrich Vogel. in aedibus B. G. Teubneri. Leipzig. 1888-1890. Greek text available at the Perseus Digital Library.
 Gaius Julius Hyginus, Astronomica from The Myths of Hyginus translated and edited by Mary Grant. University of Kansas Publications in Humanistic Studies. Online version at the Topos Text Project.
 Pausanias, Description of Greece with an English Translation by W.H.S. Jones, Litt.D., and H.A. Ormerod, M.A., in 4 Volumes. Cambridge, MA, Harvard University Press; London, William Heinemann Ltd. 1918. . Online version at the Perseus Digital Library Pausanias, Graeciae Descriptio. 3 vols. Leipzig, Teubner. 1903.  Greek text available at the Perseus Digital Library.
Pseudo-Apollodorus, The Library with an English Translation by Sir James George Frazer, F.B.A., F.R.S. in 2 Volumes, Cambridge, MA, Harvard University Press; London, William Heinemann Ltd. 1921. . Online version at the Perseus Digital Library. Greek text available from the same website.
 Publius Ovidius Naso, Metamorphoses translated by Brookes More (1859-1942). Boston, Cornhill Publishing Co. 1922. Online version at the Perseus Digital Library.
 Publius Ovidius Naso, Metamorphoses. Hugo Magnus. Gotha (Germany). Friedr. Andr. Perthes. 1892. Latin text available at the Perseus Digital Library.
 The Homeric Hymns and Homerica with an English Translation by Hugh G. Evelyn-White. Homeric Hymns. Cambridge, MA.,Harvard University Press; London, William Heinemann Ltd. 1914. Online version at the Perseus Digital Library. Greek text available from the same website.

Rhodian mythology
Thessalian mythology
LGBT themes in Greek mythology